The 1939 French Grand Prix was a Grand Prix motor race held at Reims-Gueux on 9 July 1939.

Classification

References 

French Grand Prix
French Grand Prix
1939 in French motorsport